The 2021 Mubadala World Tennis Championship was a non-ATP/WTA-affiliated exhibition tennis tournament. It was the 13th edition of the Mubadala World Tennis Championship with some of the world's top-ranked players competing in the event, held in a knockout format. The winner received $250,000 in prize money. The event was held at the International Tennis Centre at the Zayed Sports City in Abu Dhabi, United Arab Emirates. It served as a warm-up event for the upcoming season, with the 2022 ATP Tour beginning on January 1, 2022.

Andrey Rublev (ranked No. 5) and Rafael Nadal (ranked No. 6) received byes into the semifinal. Rublev defeated Andy Murray, 6–4, 7–6(7–2), to win the men's tournament. Emma Raducanu withdrew from the event the week of her scheduled match after testing positive for COVID-19 and she was replaced by Ons Jabeur, who defeated Belinda Bencic, 4–6, 6–3, [10–8], to win the women's tournament.

Champions

Men's singles 
  
  Andrey Rublev def.  Andy Murray 6–4, 7–6(7–2).

Women's singles 
  Ons Jabeur def.  Belinda Bencic 4–6, 6–3, [10–8].

Day-by-day summaries

Players

Men's singles
 Dominic Thiem (withdrew)
 Casper Ruud (withdrew)

Women's singles
 Emma Raducanu (withdrew)

References

External links
Official website

2021 in Emirati tennis
World Tennis Championship
Mubadala World Tennis Championship - Men
2021 tennis exhibitions